Vineet Jain (born 16 May 1972) is a former Indian cricketer. An opening bowler, he played first-class cricket for Haryana from 1993 to 2001, and for Tripura from 2004 to 2008.

In 2005-06 he took 2 for 20 and 7 for 29 in Tripura's first first-class victory. In 2006-07 he took 4 for 40 and 5 for 40 in their second victory.

References

External links

1972 births
Living people
Indian cricketers
Haryana cricketers
Tripura cricketers